Anthomyzidae is small, slender, yellow to black flies with narrow and elongated wings, which may have distinct markings. Some species have greatly reduced wings. Fewer than 100 species are known, mostly from Europe. Although they occur in all major regions, they seem to be most varied in the Holarctic region.

Around 20 diverse genera have been placed in the family. Two, Teratomyza and Teratoptera, are now in the Teratomyzidae, and Cyamops and Stenomicra are in the Stenomicridae. Melanthomyza Malloch from Chile should probably not be retained in the family. The remaining genera are very similar to one another.

Description

For terms see Morphology of Diptera

These are minute to small (1.3-4.5 mm), slender flies. They are yellow (sometimes with dark spots or stripes) to black in colour. The postverticals on the head are small, convergent or parallel, and rarely absent. Two or three pairs of frontal bristles, which curve backward, are present and usually preceded by one or more weaker bristles. Interfrontal bristles are absent or present. Peristomal bristles ("false vibrissae") are present. In the more common Anthomyza and Paranthomyza, the lower side of femur 1 has a well-developed spine in apical third. Wings are usually long and narrow and immaculate (sometimes marked). Some species are brachypterous. The costa has a subcostal break and the subcosta is incomplete.

Biology

Larvae have been reported from decaying dicotyledonous plants, from fungi, and in Europe from leaf sheaths of various grasses and of Typha, Scirpus, and Juncus, from Lipara galls on Phragmites. They may be either phytophagous or saprophagous, but damage to cereals or other plants has not been reported.

Adults are usually found in moist habitats such as damp meadows, marshes, bogs, and damp deciduous or mixed forests with rich undergrowth. Some species inhabit dry grasslands (some species of Anthomyza and the brachypterous Stiphrosoma sabulosum).

Phylogeny and taxa

The family includes a number of genera in two subfamilies.
Subfamily Anthomyzinae Amnonthomyza Amygdalops Anagnota Anthomyza  Apterosepsis Barbarista Carexomyza Cercagnota  Epischnomyia Fungomyza  
†Grimalantha  (Burdigalian, Dominican amber)Ischnomyia 
†Lacrimyza  (Lutetian, Baltic Amber)Margdalops Mumetopia Paranthomyza  Receptrixa Reliquantha  (Lutetian, Baltic amber)Santhomyza Stiphrosoma  Typhamyza   Zealantha 
Subfamily †Protanthomyzinae 
†Protanthomyza  (Lutetian, Baltic Amber, Bitterfeld amber)

References

Further reading
Jindřich Roháček, 1996. Revision of Palaearctic Stiphrosoma, including the Anthomyza-laeta group (Diptera, Anthomyzidae). Eur. J. Entomol. 93:89-120, ISSN 1210-5759 European Journal of Entomology
Jindřich Roháček, 1998. Taxonomic limits, phylogeny and higher classification of Anthomyzidae (Diptera), with special regard to fossil record. Eur. J. Entomol. 95:141-177, ISSN 1210-5759 European Journal of Entomology
Jindřich Roháček, 2006. A monograph of Palaearctic Anthomyzidae (Diptera), Part 1.published as supplement 1 of the Časopis Slezského zemského muzea, Vol. 55 (2006) 326 pages, 661 black-and-white illustrations. ISSN 1211-3026, 
Jindřich Roháček, 2007. Zealantha thorpei'' gen. et sp. nov. (Diptera: Anthomyzidae), first family representative from New Zealand. Zootaxa 1576: 1–13 Zootaxa

Species lists
West Palaearctic including Russia
 Australasian/Oceanian
Nearctic
Japan
World list

External links
Encyclopedia of Life - Family Anthomyzidae at EOL
Diptera.info images

 
Brachycera families
Articles containing video clips